U.S. Highway 77 Alternate  (Alt. US 77) is a north–south auxiliary route of US 77, located entirely within the state of Texas. The route was commissioned in 1953, when US 77 was rerouted in southeast Texas.

Route description

Alt. US 77 begins at an intersection with US 77 (Future I-69E) in Refugio; US 183 also begins at this point and runs concurrently with Alt. While US 77 (Future I-69E) runs to the northeast towards Victoria, US 183/Alt. US 77 travels more to the north, through unincorporated Refugio County and into Goliad County. The highway intersects State Highway 239 (SH 239) south of Goliad and runs concurrently until its reaches downtown Goliad and US 59 (Future I-69W); US 183/Alt. US 77 continues to the north, while westbound SH 239 turns onto southbound US 59 (Future I-69W). North of Goliad, past a junction with SH 119, the US Highway begins to travel slightly toward the northeast. The next major city is Cuero in DeWitt County; in a wrong-way concurrency, southbound US 87 merges on to northbound US 183/Alt. US 77, and the three US Highways stay merged until US 87 separates in downtown Cuero. North of Cuero, US 183 finally separates from Alt. US 77; US 183 turns to the northwest, while Alt. US 77 turns sharply to the northeast, toward Lavaca County and Yoakum. West of Hallettsville, Alt. US 77 merges onto Alt. US 90, and the two routes stay merged until downtown Hallettsville, where Alt. US 77 ends at another intersection with US 77.

History
The original routing of US 77 was to the southwest from Hallettsville, via Yoakum and Cuero, and then to the southeast to Victoria concurrent with US 87. In 1953, US 77 was transferred to the more direct north–south route to the east, replacing SH 295 between Hallettsville and Victoria; the original route from Hallettsville to Cuero was designated Alt. US 77. In order to have it connect with US 77 at both ends, Alt. US 77 was designated to run concurrently with US 183 (which had been renumbered from SH 29 in 1952) from Cuero to its southern terminus in Refugio.

Major intersections

Business route

Alt. US 77 has one business route in Yoakum. Officially designated by TxDOT as Business US 77-Q, it is signed with two auxiliary banners as Business Alternate US 77. The route was originally established as Loop 51 in 1939, and was redesignated in 1991. The route begins at Alt. US 77 south of Yoakum, then travels northwest into the city along Huck Street. It then turns north along Irvine Street, and has a brief concurrency with SH 111. It then turns northwest along Gonzales Street to an intersection with mainline Alt. US 77.

See also

Notes

References

External links

77 Alternate (Texas)
77 Alternate
Transportation in Refugio County, Texas
Transportation in Goliad County, Texas
Transportation in DeWitt County, Texas
Transportation in Lavaca County, Texas
Alternate (Texas)
Yoakum, Texas